Jon Anders Halvorsen (born 1968 in Lunde, Norway) is a Norwegian folk singer and physician.

Career 
Halvorsen is a graduate of the Ole Bull Academy at Voss (1998–2000) and won the prize for best vocal performer at Landskappleiken in 2002. Halvorsen is a connoisseur of the "kvede" tradition in Telemark. He collaborated with guitarist Tore Bruvoll as the character of Prins Sveinung (Tamino) in the folk music production of the opera The Magic Flute (2005–2006), by Rikskonsertene and quinces group Dvergmål. Halvorsen and Bruvoll were awarded the Folkelarmpris in 2007, in the class Innovative/Experimental. In 2012 he was nominated for the Folkelarmpris for the album Komme No Heim.

Halvorsen earned a Masters in medicine from the University of Oslo in 1996 and has worked as a physician at Telemark Sentralsjukehus, Lenvik Kommune, Oslo Legevakt, Ullevål Universitetssykehus, St. Mary's Hospital (London), and Rikshospitalet. He specializes in skin diseases and earned a PhD in Medical Sciences from the University of Oslo in 2011. http://www.med.uio.no/klinmed/personer/vit/jonahalv/

Honors 
1996: Nominated for the Spellemannprisen for the album Visor Og Kvæde Frå Blåberglandet
1998: Sagaprisen
2004–2005: Statens Kunstnerstipend
2005: Nominated for the Folkelarmprisen for the album Gåtesong
2007: Folkelarmprisen in the class Innovative for the album Trillar For To

Discography

Solo albums 
2012: Komme No Heim (Etnisk Musikklubb)

Collaborations 
Within Dvergmål
1996: Visor Og Kvæde Frå Blåberglandet (Grappa)
2004: Song i himmelsalar (Heilo)

With Tore Bruvoll
2004: Nattsang (Heilo)
2007: Trillar For To (Heilo)

With Ingvill Marit Buen Garnås
2005: Gåtesong (Etnisk Musikklubb)

With other projects
2006: Juledrøm (MFC)
2006: Jul i Svingen (NRK/Universal)

References 

1979 births
Living people
People from Telemark
Musicians from Lunde, Telemark
Heilo Music artists
21st-century Norwegian singers
21st-century Norwegian male singers